Shuangliao is a city in western Jilin, People's Republic of China, bordering Liaoning and Inner Mongolia. It is under the administration of Siping City and was previously the de jure capital of the defunct Liaobei Province.

Administrative divisions

Subdistricts:
Zhengjiatun Subdistrict, Liaodong Subdistrict, Liaonan Subdistrict, Liaoxi Subdistrict, Liaobei Subdistrict, Hongqi Subdistrict

Towns:
, Shuangshan, Wohu, Fuxian, Wangben, Bolishan, Xinglong, Dongming

Townships:
Liutiao Township, Xinli Township, Xiangyang Township, Yongjia Township, Namusi Mongol Ethnic Township

Geography and climate
Shuangliao is located at the confluence of the western and eastern branches of the Liao River as well as the Songliao Plain with the Horqin Grasslands. It borders Changtu County (Liaoning) and Lishu County to the south, Gongzhuling to the east, Changling County to the north, and the Horqin Left Middle and Left Back banners of Inner Mongolia.

Shuangliao has a four-season, monsoon-influenced, humid continental climate (Köppen Dwa). Spring and fall are somewhat short transitional periods, with some precipitation, but are usually dry and windy. Over two-thirds of the annual precipitation of  occurs from June to August.

References

External links

County-level divisions of Jilin